Micrurus nigrocinctus babaspul, or the babaspul (Creole for "barber's pole"), is a subspecies of Micrurus nigrocinctus, commonly known as the Central American coral snake. M. n. babaspul is a venomous elapid from Big Corn Island (Isla Grande del Maíz), Nicaragua. According to O'Shea (2008) this is an endangered subspecies, and the subspecies may even be extinct.

Description
M. n. babaspul is a tricoloured monadal coral snake. Its color pattern consists of rings in the order red/yellow/black/yellow/red. Being a monadal coral snake, it only has one black ring between each pair of red rings. It has a round small head with a long slender body.

Geographic Range
The babaspul is endemic to Big Corn Island, Nicaragua.

Habitat
M. n. babaspul inhabits tropical moist forests.

Diet
The babaspul will actively hunt small lizards and small snakes, and if available will take some rodents small enough for it to consume.

Reproduction
There is not much known about the reproduction of the babaspul, but it is believed to be an oviparous species.

Further reading
Roze J. 1967. "A check list of the New World venomous coral snakes (Elapidae), with descriptions of new forms". American Museum Novitates (2287): 1-60. (Micrurus nigrocinctus babaspul, new subspecies).

External links
 

nigrocinctus babaspul
Reptiles described in 1967
Snakes of the Caribbean
Reptiles of Nicaragua
Endemic fauna of Nicaragua